Ramón da Silva Ramos, commonly known as just Ramon (born March 12, 1950), is a former Brazilian football forward, who played in several Série A clubs. He was the top goalscorer of the Série A 1973.

Playing career
Ramon was born in Sirinhaém, state of Pernambuco, and started playing professionally in 1970, defending Santa Cruz, in which he played 112 games and scored 39 goals for the club, finishing as the Série A 1973 top goalscorer with 23 goals. He left the club in 1975, briefly playing for Internacional, and Sport in 1976, playing eleven Série A games and scoring three goals for the latter club. Ramon then joined Rio de Janeiro-based Vasco in 1976, scoring eleven Série A goals in 22 games, before moving to Goiás in 1979, in which he played Brazilian National League 32 games and scored eight goals. He moved to Ceará in 1981, scoring 15 Série A games in ten games, before leaving the club in the following year. After defending São José in 1983 and Ferroviário in 1984, he retired while defending Brasília in 1985.

Coaching career
After his retirement, he worked in 1995 and in 1996 as Ferroviário's head coach.

Honors

Individual
Campeonato Brasileiro Série A Top Goalscorer: 1973

Club
Ceará
Campeonato Pernambucano: 1981

Santa Cruz
Campeonato Pernambucano: 1970, 1971, 1972, 1973

Vasco
Campeonato Carioca: 1977

References

Living people
1950 births
Brazilian footballers
Brazilian football managers
Santa Cruz Futebol Clube players
Sport Club Internacional players
Sport Club do Recife players
CR Vasco da Gama players
Goiás Esporte Clube players
Ceará Sporting Club players
São José Esporte Clube players
Ferroviário Atlético Clube (CE) players
Association football forwards